Anifilm is an International Festival of Animated Films held in Třeboň, Czech Republic. It was founded in 2010. The festival features the most interesting films from the entire spectrum of animation, with awards in the categories of student work, design for television and made to order, and Best Film.

Awards

Gameday
Gameday is a video game festival that has been a part of Anifilm since 2010. Visitors can try multiple video games there and meet their developers. The Czech Game of the Year Awards were held there until 2017.

See also
Anifest

References

External links

GameDay Website
Czech Game of the Year Awards Website

 
Film festivals in the Czech Republic
Animation film festivals
Video gaming in the Czech Republic
Video game festivals
Recurring events established in 2011